Cyclamminidae is a family of Foraminifera in the order Loftusiida, ex textulariid subfamily Cyclammininae in the Treatise on Invertebrate Paleontology Part C, Protista 2.

Cyclamminids are characterized by enrolled, involute, agglutinated tests in which the walls have an outer imperforate layer and an inner alveolar layer. Apatures are interiomarginal or near the septal base.
 
Includes the subfamilies Cyclammininae, Alveolophragmiinae, Buccicrenatinae, Choffatellinae, Hemicyclammininae, and Pseudochoffatellinae, as listed.

References

 Alfred R,. Loeblich, jr. & Helen Tappan 1964. Sarcodina, Chiefly "Thecamoebians" and Foraminiferida.   Treatise on Invertebrate Paleontology, Part C, Protista 2.  Geological Society of America and University of Kansas Press.
 Cyclamminidae in GSI.ir Paleontology.   
 Textulariina in Foraminifera Morphological Classification. 

Loftusiida
Foraminifera families